The Valampurinathar Temple is a Hindu temple dedicated to Lord Siva located in Melaperumpallam, Mayiladuthurai district, Tamil Nadu, India. It situated close to Puhar and Thiruvenkadu. The temple dates back to the Medieval Cholas period.

Speciality
The temple is revered by the Thevaram hymns of Saiva nayanars, 7th century Tamil saint poets and classified as Paadal Petra Sthalam. The presiding deity is Shiva. He is called as Valampuranathar. His consort is known as Vaduvakirkanni. The temple is counted as one of the temples built on the banks of River Kaveri. This temple has samadhi of Herananda Maharishi and is called Ganapathy Sthalam

References 

Shiva temples in Mayiladuthurai district
Padal Petra Stalam
Maadakkoil